BMC Structural Biology is an open access peer-reviewed scientific journal that covers research in structural biology. The journal was established in 2001 and is published by BioMed Central. The editor-in-chief is Simon Harold.

BioMed Central academic journals
Biology journals
Publications established in 2001
English-language journals
Creative Commons Attribution-licensed journals